Peter Fox (born 5 November 1984) is an English former professional rugby league footballer who played in the 2000s and 2010s.

Background
Peter Fox was born in York, North Yorkshire, England.

Club career

Early career
Fox started his career with junior club York Acorn. He was part of the academy at Leeds Rhinos, but he failed to establish himself in the senior team, and spent two seasons on loan at hometown club the York City Knights. He scored 40-tries for the York City Knights, and was named in the National League One Dream Team 2006.

At the end of the 2006's Super League XI, he was signed by the Wakefield Trinity Wildcats.

Wakefield Trinity Wildcats
Fox made his début for the Wakefield Trinity Wildcats in the opening game of 2007's Super League XII with a 9–14 defeat by the Hull Kingston Rovers. It took him until round-5 to open his account with a try in the Wakefield Trinity Wildcats' 40-20 victory over Catalans Dragons. He signed for the Hull Kingston Rovers during September 2007.

Hull Kingston Rovers
Fox made his début for the Hull Kingston Rovers in a 12-20 defeat by the Leeds Rhinos at Headingley Rugby Stadium, Leeds. He opened his Hull Kingston Rovers account with 2-tries in a thrilling 20-24 victory in France against Catalans Dragons. In round 7 of the 2009 campaign he scored his first hat trick of his career in a 48-12 victory over Salford City Reds.

On 27 June, he made his England début in the 56-8 victory over France. He scored a try and had one disallowed.

He was in the England training squad for the 2008 Rugby League World Cup.

He was in the England team to face Wales at the Keepmoat Stadium, Doncaster prior to England's departure for the 2008 Rugby League World Cup.

On 7 November, he scored 2-tries to help England earn a shock 20-12 victory over World Champions New Zealand at Huddersfield's Galpharm Stadium, and a place in the 2009 Four Nations Final against Australia.

He has won caps for England while at the Hull Kingston Rovers in 2008 against France and Wales, and in 2009 against France, Wales, New Zealand and Australia.

He made another promising start for the Hull Kingston Rovers at the start of the 2010 season, in a home fixture against the Salford City Reds in which the Hull Kingston Rovers won 30-12, he in the process scoring two early tries. He made his 100th career appearance in the Hull Kingston Rovers' 6-32 defeat at the Wigan Warriors on 12 February 2010.

Return to the Wakefield Trinity Wildcats
Fox returned to the Wakefield Trinity Wildcats in 2012. He was released by the club during May 2014.

Doncaster
During April 2015, Fox signed for Championship side Doncaster.

Newcastle Thunder
During November 2015, it was announced the Fox was signing for Newcastle Thunder for the 2016 season.

References

External links
(archived by web.archive.org) Newcastle Thunder profile
(archived by web.archive.org) Hull KR profile
(archived by web.archive.org) Peter Fox Wildcats Profile

1984 births
Living people
Doncaster R.L.F.C. players
England national rugby league team players
English rugby league players
Halifax R.L.F.C. players
Hull Kingston Rovers players
Newcastle Thunder players
Rugby league wingers
Rugby league players from York
Wakefield Trinity players
York City Knights players